is a Japanese former professional racing cyclist who competed professionally between 2006 and 2014, entirely for the . He was the winner of the Japanese National Road Race Championships in 2009.

He joined  soon after graduating from Nihon University and had success on the UCI Asia Tour. He was the third Japanese to win a stage at the HC classified Tour de Langkawi. In addition to road races, Nishitani also represented Japan in international track cycling competitions, riding in such events as the scratch race, Madison, and omnium.

Major results

2003
Tour de Hokkaido
1st Prologue & Stage 2

2004
Tour de Hokkaido
1st Prologue, Stages 2 & 3

2006
1st Overall Tour de Hokkaido
1st Stage 3

2007
Tour of South China Sea
1st Stages 6 & 8
1st Stage 2 Tour de Hokkaido

2008
1st Stage 3 Tour de East Java
1st Stage 6 Tour de Hokkaido

2009
1st  Road race, National Road Championships
1st Stage 6 Jelajah Malaysia
1st Stage 3b Tour de Singkarak

2010
1st Stage 4 Tour de Langkawi
1st Prologue Tour de Hokkaido

2011
1st Stage 8 Tour de Taiwan
1st Stage 3 Tour de Kumano

2012
1st Stage 6 Tour of Japan
1st Stage 4 Tour of China I

2013
 Tour of Japan
1st Stages 1 (ITT) & 6
7th Overall Tour de Korea
8th Overall Tour de East Java
1st  Points classification
9th Japan Cup

2014
1st Stage 6 Tour of Thailand

References

External links

1981 births
Living people
Japanese male cyclists
People from Hiroshima Prefecture
Nihon University alumni
Asian Games medalists in cycling
Cyclists at the 2002 Asian Games
Cyclists at the 2006 Asian Games
Cyclists at the 2010 Asian Games
Medalists at the 2006 Asian Games
Asian Games silver medalists for Japan